Rozhdestveno is a rural locality (a village) in Fominskoye Rural Settlement, Gorokhovetsky District, Vladimir Oblast, Russia. The population was 48 as of 2010. There are 3 streets.

Geography 
Rozhdestveno is located on the Visha River, 47 km south of Gorokhovets (the district's administrative centre) by road. Istomino is the nearest rural locality.

References 

Rural localities in Gorokhovetsky District